Epiphytic bacteria are bacteria which live non-parasitically on the surface of a plant on various organs such as the leaves, roots, flowers, buds, seeds and fruit. In current studies it has been determined that epiphytic bacteria generally don't harm the plant, but promote the formation of ice crystals. Some produce an auxin hormone which promotes plant growth and plays a role in the life cycle of the bacteria.

Different bacteria prefer different plants and different plant organs depending on the organ's nutritional content, and depending on the bacteria's colonization system which is controlled by the host plant. Bacteria which live on leaves are referred to as phyllobacteria, and bacteria which live on the root system are referred to as rhizabacteria. They adhere to the plant surface forms as 1-cluster 2- individual bacterial cell  3- biofilm  . The age of the organ also affects the epiphytic bacteria population and characteristics and has a role in the inhibition of phytopathogen on plant. Epiphytic bacteria found in the marine environment have a role in the nitrogen cycle.

Species
There are diverse species of epiphytic bacteria. An incomplete list:
Citrobacter youngae
Bacillus thuringiensis 
Enterobacter soli
Bacillus tequilensis
Bacillus aryabhattai
Pantoea eucalypti
Pseudomonas palleroniana
Serratia nematodiphila  
Stenotrophomonas maltophilia
Pseudomonas mosselii
Pseudomonas putida
Lysinibacillus xylanilyticus
Enterobacter asburiae
Acinetobacter johnsonii
Pseudomonas macerans

Classification
Many epiphytic bacteria are rod-shaped, and classified as either gram negative or gram positive, pigmented or non-pigmented, fermentative or non-fermentative  .

Non-pigmented epiphytic bacteria have high a GC content in their genome, a characteristic which protects the bacteria from the ultraviolet rays of the sun. Because of this, these bacteria have special nutritional requirements. 
Current studies on epiphytic bacteria are underway for biotechnological applications areas such as the promotion of plant growth. Epiphytic bacteria are removed from the plant surface through ultraviolet radiation, chemical surface disinfection, and washing .

See also
 Epiliths, organisms that grow on rocks
 Zoochory, seed dispersal by animals
 Epibiont, an organism that grows on another life form
 Epiphyte
 Endosymbiont
 Epiphytic fungus

External links
 http://www.pjoes.com/pdf/12.1/83-93.pdf

References

Bacteria
Bacteriology
Botany